This article lists events that occurred during 1959 in Estonia.

Incumbents

Events
Tallinn Song Stage was built.
Tallinn Bus Station moved to its current location from the Stalin Square (Viru Square).
Population: 283,071.

Births

Deaths

References

 
1950s in Estonia
Estonia
Estonia
Years of the 20th century in Estonia